The 2013 NCAA Division I Tennis Championships were the men's and women's tennis tournaments played concurrently from May 16 to May 27, 2013 in Urbana, Illinois on the campus of the University of Illinois. It was the 67th edition of the NCAA Division I Men's Tennis Championship* and the 32nd edition of the NCAA Division I Women's Tennis Championship.* It was the eighth time the men's and women's tournaments were held at the same venue. It consisted of a men's and women's team, singles, and doubles championships.

The men's team championship was won by the Virginia Cavaliers, and the women's team championship was won by the Stanford Cardinal. The men's singles title was won by Blaz Rola from Ohio State, and the men's doubles title went to Jarmere Jenkins and Mac Styslinger of Virginia. The women's singles title was won by Nicole Gibbs of Stanford, her second consecutive singles championship. The women's doubles title was also won by the pair of Kaitlyn Christian and Sabrina Santamaria from USC.

Men's team championship
Note: Matches from the First Round and Second Round were held at the home courts of the national seeds with the winning team advancing to the championship rounds in Urbana, Illinois.

National seeds

1.   UCLA (Championship Round)
2.  Virginia (National Champions)
3.   Georgia (semifinals)
4.   USC (quarterfinals)
5.  Ohio State (semifinals)
6.  Ole Miss (second round)
7.  Tennessee (quarterfinals)
8.  Kentucky (Round of 16)
9.  Duke (quarterfinals)
10.  Mississippi State (Round of 16)
11.  Pepperdine (quarterfinals)
12.  Texas A&M (Round of 16)
13.  Baylor (Round of 16)
14.  Oklahoma (Round of 16)
15.  Florida (first round)
16.  Vanderbilt (Round of 16)

Finals bracket

Women's team championship
Note: Matches from the First Round and Second Round were held at the home courts of the national seeds with the winning team advancing to the championship rounds in Urbana, Illinois.

National seeds

1. Florida (semifinals)
2. North Carolina (quarterfinals)
3. Texas A&M (Championship Round)
4. Georgia (quarterfinals)

5. USC (Round of 16)
6. Miami (FL) (quarterfinals)
7. UCLA (semifinals)
8. California (quarterfinals)

9. Alabama (Round of 16)
10. Michigan (Round of 16)
11. Northwestern (Round of 16)
12. Stanford (National Champions)

13. Clemson (Round of 16)
14. Virginia (Round of 16)
15. Nebraska (Round of 16)
16. Texas Tech (second round)

Finals bracket

Men's singles championship
Note: Matches from all six rounds were held in Urbana, Illinois.

National seeds

 Mikelis Libietis, Tennessee (first round)
 Alex Domijan, Virginia (first round)
 Jarmere Jenkins, Virginia (Championship Round)
 Anthony Rossi, Kentucky (second round)
 Romain Bogaerts, Mississippi State (first round)
 Emilio Gomez, USC (first round)
 Peter Kobelt, Ohio State (Round of 16)
 Henrique Cunha, Duke (quarterfinals)

Players ranked 9th–16th in no particular order
Matija Pecotic, Princeton (second round)
Sebastian Fanselow, Pepperdine (semifinals)
Ray Sarmiento, USC (Round of 16)
Nik Scholtz, Ole Miss (first round)
Ryan Lipman, Vanderbilt (second round)
Evan King, Michigan (quarterfinals)
Kyle McMorrow, Washington (Round of 16)
Blaz Rola, Ohio State (National Champion)

Finals bracket

Women's singles championship
Note: Matches from all six rounds were held in Urbana, Illinois.

National seeds

 Lauren Embree, Florida (first round)
 Sabrina Santamaria, USC (second round)
 Robin Anderson, UCLA (Round of 16)
 Christina Sanchez-Quintanar, Texas A&M (Round of 16)
 Zsofi Susanyi, California (Round of 16)
 Lauren Herring, Georgia (quarterfinals)
 Gina Suarez-Malaguti, North Carolina (quarterfinals)
 Anett Schutting, California (first round)

Players ranked 9th–16th in no particular order
Danielle Lao, USC (first round)
Petra Niedermayerova, Kansas State (Round of 16)
Nicole Gibbs, Stanford (National Champion)
Yana Koroleva, Clemson (quarterfinals)
Krista Hardebeck, Stanford (Round of 16)
Mary Weatherholt, Nebraska (Championship Round)
Julie Elbaba, Virginia (second round)
Sofie Oyen, Florida (first round)

Finals bracket

Men's doubles championship
Note: Matches from the First Round and Round of 16 were also held in Urbana, Illinois on May 23 and May 24, respectively.

National seeds

 Mikelis Libietis / Hunter Reese, Tennessee (Round of 16)
 Henrique Cunha / Raphael Hemmeler, Duke (semifinals)
 Jonas Lutjen / Nik Scholtz, Ole Miss (semifinals)
 Jarmere Jenkins / Mac Styslinger, Virginia (champions)

Players ranked 5th–8th in no particular order
Hernus Pieters / Ben Wagland, Georgia (quarterfinals)
Junior Ore / Jackson Withrow, Texas A&M (Round of 16)
Jarryd Botha / David Vieyra, Alabama (Round of 16)
Daniel Cochrane / Andreas Mies, Auburn (quarterfinals)

Finals bracket

Women's doubles championship
Note: Matches from the First Round and Round of 16 were also held in Urbana, Illinois on May 23 and May 24, respectively.

National seeds

 Kate Fuller / Silvia Garcia, Georgia (quarterfinals)
 Kaitlyn Christian / Sabrina Santamaria, USC (champions)
 Patricia Veresova / Mary Weatherholt, Nebraska (quarterfinals)
 Brynn Boren / Kata Szekely, Tennessee (semifinals)

Players ranked 5th–8th in no particular order
Alexa Guarachi / Mary Anne Macfarlane, Alabama (semifinals)
Emina Bektas / Brooke Bolender, Michigan (first round)
Kristie Ahn / Nicole Gibbs, Stanford (first round)
Hermon Brhane / Whitney Ritchie, Oklahoma (Round of 16)

Finals bracket

Women's championship

References

NCAA Division I tennis championships
NCAA Division I Tennis Championships
NCAA Division I Tennis Championships
NCAA Division I Tennis Championships
Tennis tournaments in Illinois